Aquitaine Marble (also Aquitanian Marble, Celtic Marble, and Grand Antique of Aubertin), is a prestigious marble, composed of clasts of black limestone and white calcite, quarried near Aubertin in France. The fault breccia from which it is extracted was formed at the end of the Cretaceous period following the corrugation that affected the Northern Pyrenean area about 65 million years ago.

The marble was first quarried by the Romans in the third or fourth century and was exported in large quantities to Rome and Constantinople, primarily for decorative columns. Roman examples include the ciborium in Santa Cecilia and the candelabra of the Paschal candle in Santa Maria Maggiore. In Byzantium, the marble was used for decorative panels in Hagia Sophia.

The quarry was subsequently closed, and the blocks already extracted were utilized for several churches, including St Peter's Basilica in Rome, St Mark's Basilica in Venice, and Westminster in London. The marble was widely used by Émile-Jacques Ruhlmann for fireplaces. Examples are also found in the Les Invalides, for the columns on the altar in the chapel and the tomb of Joseph Napoleon, and at Versailles.

The quarry reopened in the nineteenth century but closed again in the early twentieth.

References

Building materials
Marble